The Misawa Helicopter Airlift Squadron also known as the Misawa Helicopter Transport Squadron is a unit of the Japan Air Self-Defense Force. It comes under the authority of the Air Rescue Wing. It is based at Misawa Air Base in Aomori Prefecture. It is equipped with CH-47J aircraft.

Tail marking
As with other helicopter airlift squadrons, it has the emblem of the Air Rescue Wing with a sticker stating the home base of the unit.

Aircraft operated
 CH-47J (1989-present)

References

Units of the Japan Air Self-Defense Force